My Mama Never Taught Me How to Cook: The Aura Years 1978–1982 is a compilation album by composer, singer, songwriter, and producer Annette Peacock. It brings together material previously released by the Aura label on X-Dreams (1978), The Perfect Release (1979), and The Collection (1982), and was released by Sanctuary Records in 2004.

Reception

In a review for AllMusic, Richie Unterberger wrote: "These recordings' mix of jazz fusion, album-oriented rock, and Peacock's unusual blend of jazzy singing with sensually spoken intellectual poetic passages was too offbeat to get any more than a cult audience, though it's more accessible than many a cult rock artist's work. This is as complete a document of that part of her career as any fan could wish for."

A reviewer for Pitchfork stated: "None of her records... capture Peacock's singing as clearly and thoroughly as this collection...  It was easier to sound mysterious in the 70s, when your career, the story behind your career, and the subtext under everything you did weren't put under a microscope. But even by those standards, Peacock's a cipher: She lets the work speak for itself, when it so chooses."

The BBC'''s Peter Marsh commented: "Hardly a month goes by these days without the rediscovery of some neglected talent... In Annette Peacock's case, the words 'neglected' and 'talent' don't really begin to do her justice, but her rediscovery's been a long time coming... Though she's never achieved... commercial success, there's no doubt that Peacock's talent is still deserving of wider recognition."

Writing for The Herald, Keith Bruce noted that the album is "both outspokenly political and louchely sensual, experimental and downright groovy, and contains one of the great alternative slogans to the Atkins diet in its opening line: 'My mama never taught me how to cook - that's why I'm so skinny'."

Track listing
"Don't Be Cruel" composed by Otis Blackwell and Elvis Presley. Remaining tracks composed by Annette Peacock

 "My Mama Never Taught Me How to Cook" – 5:30
 "Real & Defined Androgens" – 10:59
 "Dear Bela" – 3:02
 "This Feel Within" – 5:20
 "Too Much in the Skies" – 4:54
 "Don't Be Cruel" – 4:35
 "Questions" – 2:55
 "Love's Out to Lunch" – 2:22
 "Solar Systems" – 3:07
 "American Sport" – 3:43
 "A Loss of Consciousness" – 3:43
 "Rubber Hunger" – 4:21
 "The Succubus" – 3:49
 "Survival" – 14:48
 "Mexico" – 2:50
 "What's It Like in Your Dreams" – 2:30

 Tracks 1–7 originally appeared on X-Dreams (Aura, 1978). Tracks 8–14 originally appeared on The Perfect Release (Aura, 1979). Tracks 15–16 originally appeared on The Collection'' (Aura, 1982).

Personnel on tracks 1–7 
 Annette Peacock – vocals, keyboards, synthesizer
 Dave Chambers – saxophone
 George Khan – saxophone
 Ray Warleigh – saxophone
 Peter Lemer – keyboards
 Tom Cosgrove – guitar
 Brian Godding – guitar
 Phil Lee – guitar
 Jim Mullen – guitar
 Mick Ronson – guitar
 Chris Spedding – guitar
 Jeff Clyne – bass
 Steve Cook – bass
 Kuma Harada – bass
 Peter Pavli – bass
 Stu Woods – bass
 Bill Bruford – drums
 John Halsey – drums
 Rick Marotta – drums
 Dave Sheen – drums
 Brother James – congas, percussion
 Darryl Lee Que – congas

Personnel on tracks 8–16 
 Annette Peacock – vocals
 Robert Ahwai – guitar
 Max Middleton – keyboards
 John McKenzie – bass
 Richard Bailey – drums
 Darryl Lee Que – percussion
 Lennox Laington – percussion, steel drums

References

2004 compilation albums
Annette Peacock albums
Sanctuary Records compilation albums